Jozef Menich (born 15 September 1994) is a Slovak footballer who last played as a centre-back for Partizani Tirana.

Club career

MFK Ružomberok
Menich made his Fortuna Liga debut for Ružomberok against Spartak Myjava on 6 August 2016.

References

External links
 MFK Ružomberok official club profile 
 
 Futbalnet profile 

1994 births
Living people
Slovak footballers
Slovak expatriate footballers
Sportspeople from Banská Bystrica
Association football defenders
ŠK Kremnička players
MFK Lokomotíva Zvolen players
MFK Ružomberok players
ŠKF Sereď players
FC Spartak Trnava players
FC ViOn Zlaté Moravce players
FK Partizani Tirana players
3. Liga (Slovakia) players
2. Liga (Slovakia) players
Slovak Super Liga players
Kategoria Superiore players
Slovak expatriate sportspeople in Albania
Expatriate footballers in Albania